Visa requirements for Belarusian citizens are administrative entry restrictions imposed on citizens of Belarus by the authorities of other states. As of 19 July 2022, Belarusian citizens had visa-free or visa on arrival access to 78 countries and territories, ranking the Belarusian passport 71st in terms of travel freedom according to the Henley Passport Index.

Visa requirements map

Visa requirements

Territories and disputed areas
Visa requirements for Belarusian citizens for visits to various territories, disputed areas and restricted zones:

Permission stamps
Until 1 January 2008, Belarusian citizens had to apply for permission stamps in their passports in order to cross Belarusian borders. Permission stamps were only issued if there were no specific legal restrictions for their travel.

In 2002, the Constitutional Court of Belarus stated in its decision that permission stamps were not constitutional. The Council of Ministers was ordered to propose a different kind of a citizen border control before 1 January 2006.

The decree of the President of the Republic of Belarus dated 17 December 2007 finally abolished permission stamps.

Non-visa restrictions

See also

 Visa policy of Belarus
 Belarusian passport

References and Notes
References

Notes

Belarus
Foreign relations of Belarus